Gelophaula is a genus of moths belonging to the subfamily Tortricinae of the family Tortricidae.

Species
Gelophaula aenea (Butler, 1877)
Gelophaula aridella Clarke, 1934
Gelophaula lychnophanes (Meyrick, 1916)
Gelophaula palliata (Philpott, 1914)
Gelophaula praecipitalis Meyrick, 1934
Gelophaula siraea (Meyrick, 1885)
Gelophaula tributaria (Philpott, 1913)
Gelophaula trisulca (Meyrick, 1916)
Gelophaula vana Philpott, 1928

See also
List of Tortricidae genera

References

External links
tortricidae.com

Archipini
Tortricidae genera